Tomasz Chałas (born 20 July 1988 in Pruszków) is a Polish retired footballer who played as a forward.

Career

Club
As a youth, he trained at his hometown club Znicz Pruszków, with a brief spell at Agrykola Warszawa. In the fall of 2008 he joined Legia Warsaw's youth team playing in the Młoda Ekstraklasa. The contract was terminated by mutual agreement during the winter transfer window. He then signed a two-year deal with Znicz Pruszków in the Polish First League. In July 2010, he joined Górnik Zabrze in the Ekstraklasa.

In February 2011, he was loaned to Dolcan Ząbki on a half year deal. He returned to Górnik half a year later.

International
He was a part of Poland national under-21 football team.

References

External links 
 
 
 

1988 births
Living people
Polish footballers
Poland under-21 international footballers
Ekstraklasa players
I liga players
II liga players
III liga players
Znicz Pruszków players
Górnik Zabrze players
Ząbkovia Ząbki players
Olimpia Elbląg players
Zawisza Bydgoszcz players
Pogoń Szczecin players
Kolejarz Stróże players
OKS Stomil Olsztyn players
MKS Kluczbork players
Polonia Warsaw players
KSZO Ostrowiec Świętokrzyski players
People from Pruszków
Sportspeople from Masovian Voivodeship
Association football forwards